The Ashe County Courthouse in Jefferson, North Carolina is a Beaux Arts style building built in 1904.  It was designed by architects Wheeler & Runge.

It was listed on the National Register of Historic Places in 1979.

Museum of Ashe County History
The Museum of Ashe County History has restored and is located in the historic Ashe County Courthouse.  Exhibits include photos, artifacts from area industries, a railroad room with a model train layout and railroad artifacts, a room honoring Ashe County veterans, and the Ashe County Sports Hall of Fame.

References

External links
 Museum of Ashe County History

County courthouses in North Carolina
Courthouses on the National Register of Historic Places in North Carolina
Beaux-Arts architecture in North Carolina
Government buildings completed in 1904
Buildings and structures in Ashe County, North Carolina
National Register of Historic Places in Ashe County, North Carolina